Space Lawyer is a science fiction novel by American writer Nat Schachner. It was released in 1953 by Gnome Press in an edition of 4,000 copies.  The novel is a fix-up from two short stories, "Old Fireball" and "Jurisdiction", both of which had originally appeared in the magazine Astounding.

Sources

External links

"Old Fireball", Nat Schachner, Astounding Science Fiction, June 1941
"Jurisdiction", Nat Schachner, Astounding Science Fiction, August 1941

1953 American novels
1953 science fiction novels
American science fiction novels
Gnome Press books